Poovalur is a village in the Pattukkottai taluk of Thanjavur district, Tamil Nadu, India.

Demographics 

As per the 2001 census, Poovalur had a total population of 1335 with 640 males and 695 females. The sex ratio was 1086. The literacy rate was 66.7.

References 

 

Villages in Thanjavur district